Lee Hyun-jung may refer to:
 Lee Hyun-jung (curler) (이현정)
 Lee Hyun-jung (basketball) (이현중)